The Château de la Lande is a castle in the commune of Rocles in the Allier départment in the Auvergne region of France.

History
Early in its history it was supposedly a possession or commandery of the Knights Templar.

The castle dates from the 15th century, with later construction in the 17th century.

Among its later owners was the de Lichy de Lichy family.

It has been listed since 2001 as a monument historique by the French Ministry of Culture.

Description
The castle is typical of a series of Bourbonnais castles of the 15th century. The keep is crowned with a round walk constructed from wood. There is a moat and an older tower with defensive devices. The small chapel was designed by the architect René Moreau.

Notes

External links
  Le château de la Lande. Retrieved 11 June 2011
  Château de la Lande on French Ministry of Culture website, with photos. Retrieved 31 May 2020.
Summed up and translated from the equivalent article at French Wikipédia, 10 November 2007

Buildings and structures completed in the 14th century
Castles in Auvergne-Rhône-Alpes
Allier
Castles and fortifications of the Knights Templar